Sandall may refer to:

Surname
Jane Sandall, midwifery and women's health academic
John Sandall, Gascon medieval Lord High Treasurer, Lord Chancellor and Bishop of Winchester
Robert Sandall (1952–2010), British musician, music journalist and radio presenter
Roger Sandall (1933–2012), essayist and commentator on cultural relativism, author of The Culture Cult
Scott Sandall, American politician and a Republican member of the Utah House of Representatives

Places
Sandall Park, park in Doncaster, South Yorkshire, England
Kirk Sandall, suburb of northeastern Doncaster in South Yorkshire, England

See also
Sandal
Sandl